Carmel is an unincorporated community in Preston County, in the U.S. state of West Virginia.

History
A post office called Carmel was established in 1880, and remained in operation until 1912. The community most likely takes its name from Mount Carmel in Western Asia.

References

Unincorporated communities in Preston County, West Virginia
Unincorporated communities in West Virginia